Strojarska Business Center is a commercial and residential center in Zagreb, Croatia. The center has 6 buildings, two of which are residential buildings. There are two skyscrapers in the center. The main building, Building B, which has 25 floors and is 315 feet tall is the tallest residential building in Croatia. The complex is called the VMD area.

All buildings have been completed. Skyscraper of 25 floors occupied by the end of 2014, while other buildings inhabited earlier.

Business center Strojarska will have garages on 4 underground levels for 850 cars. The project is worth about 750 million. On the part of the land between the building and the bus station will be regulated by a public park and playground.

Gallery

References

External links

Buildings and structures in Zagreb
Commercial buildings completed in 2015
2015 establishments in Croatia